The Unilever Research & Development Port Sunlight Laboratory is the multinational consumer goods company Unilever's main research and development facility in the United Kingdom. It is located in Bebington, Merseyside.

History

Unilever's predecessor companies conducted research in Bebington from 1890 and the first dedicated research building was built in 1911 by Lever Brothers. Unilever was formed in 1929, and until 1951 Port Sunlight was its main research laboratory worldwide.

1960s
It created a research division in 1961. In the early 1960s the site researched colloid chemistry, surface active phenomena, rheology of dispersions, surface chemistry, fluorescence of dyestuffs, adsorbed films on liquids, germicides, timber technology (for West Africa), and paper chromatography. Organic chemists, physical chemists and physicists worked there. In the 1960s the site was run by Unilever Research. In 1964, newly-employed scientists would be earning £1,450. New buildings in the mid-1960s meant more staff. 

In 1965 the site installed an IBM System/360 (128k storage) computer at Port Sunlight, connected with time-sharing to IBM 1050 consoles at other sites; it claimed to be the first time such a computer system had been installed in the UK for industrial research. In February 1964, planning permission was applied for a site at Spital, on Port Sunlight golf course. By 1964 the site had an IBM 1620 computer. In 1965 the site formed an Operational Research Section at Port Sunlight, and their computers used PL/I and Fortran IV. In 1967 statisticians used control charts, timeseries analysis, multivariate analysis and stochastic processes. From early 1969 the consoles at the site were IBM 2780 with the MFT2 and HASPII operating systems. By 1969, new laboratories were built.

1970s
In 1976, Dr Gordon Tiddy of Unilever studied lyotropic liquid crystals with the University of Leeds Chemistry department. In 1978, the site carried out inelastic electron tunnelling spectroscopy with Leicester Polytechnic on an SRC CASE studentship. In 1979 their statistical computer packages were NAG, and GLIM 1–3.

In the 1970s scientists at Port Sunlight discovered tetraacetylethylenediamine (TAED), which allows clothes to be washed at lower temperatures.

1980s
In 1981 the site conducted work with the University of Oxford, involving free radicals, spin trapping and redox-active enzymes with Dr (later Professor) Allen Hill. In 1987 it conducted fluorescence-coupled surface plasmon resonance research with Durham University Department of Physics.

2010s
In 2017, Anglo-Dutch Unilever opened a £24m Advanced Manufacturing Centre, built by BAM Construction (owned by the Dutch Royal BAM Group), at the site, with a Materials Innovation Factory at the University of Liverpool, helped by the Regional Growth Fund.

Funding
By 1970 its research division had 4,600 scientists with a budget of £32 million (current value £ million), rising to £219 million in 1983 (current value £ million), then £330 million in 1987 (current value £ million). By the end of the 1980s there were around 400 scientists at Port Sunlight.

Activities
Over 750 scientists are currently based at the laboratory. It conducts research for products including Dove, Sunsilk and Domestos.

Unilever operates similar research facilities in Vlaardingen, Colworth, Shanghai, Bangalore and Trumbull.
Unilever had a defined benefit pension plan up until 2019.

Gallery

References

External links
 Unilever

1911 establishments in England
Buildings and structures in the Metropolitan Borough of Wirral
Chemical industry in the United Kingdom
Chemical research institutes
Research institutes in Merseyside
Unilever